Iran sent two competitors to the 2018 Winter Paralympics in Pyeongchang, South Korea: one man and one woman who competed in para-alpine skiing. Elaheh Gholi Fallah was announced as the flag bearer.

Team 
Iran's two competitors at the 2018 Winter Paralympics were one man and one woman both of whom competed in para-alpine skiing. Elaheh Gholi Fallah was announced as the flag bearer in late February. She is the first blind person to carry the flag for Iran at the Winter Paralympics.

The table below contains the list of members of people (called "Team Iran") that will be participating in the 2018 Games.

Results

Cross-country skiing 

Men

Women

Snowboarding 

Banked slalom

Snowboard cross

References 

2018
Nations at the 2018 Winter Paralympics
2018 in Iranian sport